Cylindropuntia calmalliana is a species of flowering plant in the family Cactaceae, native to Mexico (Baja California). It was first described in 1896 by John Merle Coulter, as Opuntia calmalliana.

References

calmalliana
Flora of Northwestern Mexico
Plants described in 1896